Warburgia stuhlmannii is a species of plant in the family Canellaceae. The genus is named after Dr  Otto Warburg, botanist and lecturer in Berlin. and the species after Franz Stuhlmann, also a renowned botanist who directed the Amani Research Institute and its botanical garden in German East Africa.  It is a rare, small, evergreen tree, reaching heights from 12 to 24 metres, and has glossy leaves.  It is found in the coastal woodlands and forests of Kenya and Tanzania and is threatened by habitat loss. It is known as mkaa in Swahili.

References

Canellaceae
Vulnerable plants
Flora of Kenya
Flora of Tanzania
Taxonomy articles created by Polbot